Lastre is a surname. Notable people with the surname include:

Carlos Lastre (born 1950), Cuban weightlifter
Yunio Lastre (born 1981), Cuban discus thrower

See also
Laster (surname)